Obesity in Ukraine is a health issue in Ukraine. Overall, 53% are considered overweight and 20% meet the definition of obesity. The Donetsk and Poltava regions are considered the most overweight. The lack of a healthy diet has been cited as a cause of obesity.

Overview

The percentage of overweight Ukrainians is at 53% of the population and the percentage of Ukrainians who meet the definition of obese is 20%. Statistics show that Ukrainians continue to gain weight. Doctors claim that the regions with the "thickest Ukrainians" are Donetsk and Poltava regions. Crimea is considered "the most slender region of the country"  The percentage of overweight people in Crimea is 49,7% and the percentage of people who meet the definition of obesity is 12,3%.

Causes

The Ukrainian Health Ministry stated in late 2012 that 70 percent of Ukrainians do not eat enough fruits and vegetables. Eating the wrong food can "lead to a deficiency of essential nutrients in the body, digestive system and heart, obesity, diabetes and even cancer." Chief Dietitian Ministry Oleg Shvets said that "the blame - a habit to eat properly. Excess sweet, refined foods, sodas and juices from concentrate has a daily rate of one third of Ukrainian students."

See also 
 Health in Ukraine

References

Health in Ukraine